Shine on Harvest Moon, starring Ann Sheridan and Dennis Morgan, is a 1944 musical–biographical film of the vaudeville team of Nora Bayes and Jack Norworth who wrote the popular song "Shine On, Harvest Moon". The film was directed by David Butler. Ann Sheridan's singing voice was dubbed by Lynn Martin (the second and last time in her film career).

Plot

Cast
 Ann Sheridan as Nora Bayes (singing voice was dubbed by Lynn Martin)
 Dennis Morgan as Jack Norworth
 Jack Carson as The Great Georgetti
 Irene Manning as Blanche Mallory
 S. Z. Sakall as Poppa Carl
 Marie Wilson as Margie
 Robert Shayne as Dan Costello
 Bob Murphy as Police Sergeant
 The Four Step Brothers as Dance Team

Musical numbers
1. "Overture" - Played by Orchestra behind titles. 
2. "Shine On, Harvest Moon / Daisy / In My Merry Oldsmobile" - Sung by Chorus. 
3. "San Antonio" - Sung and Danced by Irene Manning. 
4. "Be My Little Baby Bumble Bee" - Sung by Irene Manning. 
5. "My Own United States" - Sung by Ann Sheridan (dubbed by Lynn Martin) and Chorus, Danced by Chorus. 
6. "Time Waits for No One" - Sung by Ann Sheridan (dubbed by Lynn Martin). 
7. "It Looks Like a Big Night Tonight" - Sung and Danced by Bob Murphy, Jack Carson, Dennis Morgan, Ann Sheridan (dubbed by Lynn Martin) and Chorus. 
8. "Time Waits for No One" (reprise) - Sung by Ann Sheridan (dubbed by Lynn Martin). 
9. "We're Doing Our Best / Don't Let the Rainy Days Get You" - Sung and Danced by Ann Sheridan (dubbed by Lynn Martin) and Irene Manning. 
10. "How Can They Tell That I'm Irish" - Sung and Danced by Ann Sheridan (dubbed by Lynn Martin). 
11. "Shine On, Harvest Moon" - Sung by Dennis Morgan and Ann Sheridan (dubbed by Lynn Martin). 
12. "When It's Apple Blossom Time in Normandy / Take Me Out to the Ball Game / I've Got a Garden in Sweden / Breezin' Along with the Breeze / Who's Your Honey Lamb" - Sung by Dennis Morgan and Ann Sheridan (dubbed by Lynn Martin). 
13. "So Dumb But So Beautiful" - Sung by Jack Carson and Marie Wilson and danced by The Ashburns. 
14. "Shine On, Harvest Moon" (reprise) - Sung by Dennis Morgan. 
15. "Thank You for the Dance" - Sung and Danced by Irene Manning and Chorus. 
16. "Every Little Movement (Has a Meaning of Its Own)" - Sung by Irene Manning. 
17. "I Go for You" - Sung by Dennis Morgan and Ann Sheridan (dubbed by Lynn Martin). 
18. "Just Like a Gypsy" - Sung by Ann Sheridan (dubbed by Lynn Martin). 
19. "Just Like a Gypsy" (reprise) - Sung by Phyllis Kennedy. 
20. Finale (in Technicolor):

1. "Shine On, Harvest Moon" - Sung by Dennis Morgan and Ann Sheridan (dubbed by Lynn Martin). 
2. "Time Waits for No One" - Sung by Dennis Morgan and Chorus. 
3. "So Dumb But So Beautiful" - Sung by Jack Carson and Marie Wilson. 
4. "Shine On, Harvest Moon" - Sung by Chorus and Danced by The Four Step Brothers. 
5. "Shine On, Harvest Moon" - Sung by Dennis Morgan, Ann Sheridan (dubbed by Lynn Martin) and Chorus.

Reception

Critical review
Bosley Crowther of The New York Times wrote: "What is done in the name of biography in the Warner Brothers' 'Shine on Harvest Moon' is something which shouldn't be done to a burglar—let alone to the memory of the late Nora Bayes. For this musical film in which that lady and her second husband, Jack Norworth, are supposedly represented in their joint and devoted careers is no more veracious to the real thing than if it were a story of Alice Faye. It is simply another of those musicals which dig back into the past for a score of nostalgic ditties and some old-time vaudeville atmosphere; a film in which a songsmith falls in love with a honky-tonk girl and sticks with her through trials and tribulations until they finally emerge together on top. And if anyone goes expecting to see Ann Sheridan play Nora Bayes, or Dennis Morgan play Jack Norworth, this is to make it understood that you will not."

Box office
According to Warner Bros records the film earned $2,557,000 domestically and $1,149,000 foreign.

References

External links
 
 
 
 

1944 films
1940s biographical films
American biographical films
American musical films
Biographical films about singers
Films directed by David Butler
Films set in the 1900s
Warner Bros. films
Films scored by Heinz Roemheld
Cultural depictions of pop musicians
1944 musical films
1940s English-language films
1940s American films